The 1986–87 Fairfield Stags men's basketball team represented Fairfield University in the 1986–87 NCAA Division I men's basketball season. The Stags, led by second year head coach Mitch Buonaguro, played their home games at Alumni Hall in Fairfield, Connecticut as members of the Metro Atlantic Athletic Conference. They finished the season 15–16, 5–9 in MAAC play to 7th during the conference regular season. The Stags elevated their play to win the MAAC tournament and earn the conference's automatic bid to the NCAA tournament as No. 16 seed in the Midwest region. Making their second straight appearance in the NCAA Tournament, the Stags were beaten by No. 1 seed and eventual National champion Indiana, 92–58, in the opening round.

Roster

Schedule and results 

|-
!colspan=12 style=| Regular season

|-
!colspan=12 style=| MAAC Tournament

|-
!colspan=12 style=| NCAA Tournament

|-

Source

References

Fairfield Stags men's basketball seasons
Fairfield Stags
Fairfield
Fairfield Stags men's basketball
Fairfield Stags men's basketball